Hanna Åhlén (born 18 February 1994) is a Swedish handball player for french league club Handball Club Celles-sur-Belle.

She played for the Swedish club Skuru IK for seven years but after defeat in four straight finals in Swedish championship she left for Denmark. After only one year in Denmark she came to former top club Larvik HK in Norway. She only played one year there and left for France.

Achievements

Club 

 Swedish league (Svensk handbollselit):
 Runner up: 2014, 2015, 2016, 2019 (with Skuru IK)

References

1994 births
Living people
Swedish female handball players
21st-century Swedish women